The 1910 New Hampshire gubernatorial election was held on November 8, 1910. Republican nominee Robert P. Bass defeated Democratic nominee Clarence E. Carr with 53.36% of the vote.

General election

Candidates
Major party candidates
Robert P. Bass, Republican
Clarence E. Carr, Democratic

Other candidates
Ash Warren Drew, Socialist
John C. Berry, Prohibition

Results

References

1910
New Hampshire
Gubernatorial